Charles Spring may refer to:

 Charles A. Spring (1800–1892), American merchant and religious leader
 Charles A. Spring, Jr. (1826–1901), Chicago capitalist
 Charlie Spring, a character from the graphic novel Heartstopper